James Allan Jr. (January 18, 1845 - September 1, 1932) was a member of the Wisconsin State Assembly.

Biography
Allan was born on January 18, 1845, in Brooklyn, New York. During the American Civil War, he served with the 27th Wisconsin Volunteer Infantry Regiment of the Union Army, achieving the rank of sergeant. Events he took part in include the Siege of Vicksburg, the Battle of Jenkins' Ferry, and the Battle of Spanish Fort. He died in Vienna, Virginia, on September 1, 1932, and was interred in Arlington National Cemetery.

Political career
Allan was a member of the Assembly in 1879. Other positions he held include Postmaster of Adell, Wisconsin, and justice of the peace. He was a Republican.

References

Politicians from Brooklyn
People from Sheboygan County, Wisconsin
Republican Party members of the Wisconsin State Assembly
Wisconsin postmasters
American justices of the peace
People of Wisconsin in the American Civil War
Union Army soldiers
1845 births
1932 deaths